Leszek Goździk (20 January 1922 – 27 December 1983) was a football player and manager.

Football

Goździk started his playing career with Okęcie Warszawa, playing with the team until 1947. In the summer of 1947 Goździk moved to Lechia Gdańsk where he played until 1955, making a total of 127 appearances and scoring 52 goals in all competitions. His time at Lechia saw 3 promotions and 2 relegation's, and was part of the first Lechia team to play in Poland's top division. 

In 1958 Goździk became the manager of Lechia, leaving the role in the same year of his appointment.

Honours

Lechia Gdańsk
Klasa A (Divisional Leagues) Gdańsk group (2): 1947, 1948
II Liga (Group A) (1): 1951
II Liga runner-up (1): 1954
Puchar Polski runner-up (1): 1955

References

1922 births
1983 deaths
Polish footballers
Polish football managers
Lechia Gdańsk players
Lechia Gdańsk managers
People from Tomaszów Mazowiecki
Association football forwards